The simple station Rionegro is part of the TransMilenio mass-transit system of Bogotá, Colombia, which opened in the year 2000.

Location 

The station is located in northwestern Bogotá, specifically on Avenida Suba with Calle 91.

It serves the Rionegro and La Castellana neighborhoods.

History 
In 2006, phase two of the TransMilenio system was completed, including the Avenida Suba line, on which this station is located.

The station is named Rionegro, as it is located two blocks from the location where Avenida Suba crosses the Rionegro canal, which runs west of the Juan Amarillo River. The canal runs from the east, from the El Virrey channel through El Virrey park.

The neighborhood located to the west of the station takes the same name; Rionegro.

Station services

Main line service

Feeder routes 
This station does not have connections to feeder routes.

Inter-city service 
This station does not have inter-city service.

See also 
 Bogotá
 TransMilenio
 List of TransMilenio Stations

External links 
 TransMilenio

TransMilenio